"Feel So High" is a song by British singer-songwriter Des'ree, released as the first single from her debut album, Mind Adventures (1992). The song was co-written by Des'ree with Michael Graves and received critical acclaim, peaking at  13 in the UK and No. 67 on the US Billboard Hot 100. Three different music videos were produced to promote the single.

Details
"Feel So High" was the song that got Des'ree signed to a major label, as it was the song that was on the demo tape she sent to the label. She specifically sent the tape to Lincoln Elias of the Sony label to sign her because it was him who had signed Terence Trent D'Arby and felt only he and his label would understand her music approach.

Ashley Ingram, who eventually produced "Feel So High" and most of the album, said that "[Elias] played me a very rough demo of the song that later became 'Feel So High.' It's not often that a singer can present a demo tape and expect the powers-that-be to acknowledge the full wonders, but on a creative level she shone. She leapt out of the cassette."

Release

Europe
The single was released in August 1991, a mere 12 weeks after the label had signed her, giving Des'ree a record of shortest time between signing to a label and releasing a record. Initially, the record failed to have much success, peaking at a low No. 51 on the UK chart. In January 1992, while Des'ree was still recording her debut album, the song was re-released with a different mix and this time it became a hit, peaking at No. 13 on the UK chart. When released worldwide in 1992, it was a moderate hit around Europe, peaking within the top 40 in most countries, with a best showing in Sweden, where it became a top 10 hit peaking at No. 9.

US
In the US, "Feel So High" had been only released as a promo single and her debut album went unreleased there. Since American people were unfamiliar with the song, Sony decided to include the track as a bonus song on the US edition of Des'ree's second album I Ain't Movin'. With most music reviewers singling out the song, Des'ree's American label decided to issue "Feel So High" as the follow-up to her US top ten hit "You Gotta Be" in March 1995. The single failed to catch on as her previous single, and stalled at No. 67 on the Billboard Hot 100, becoming Des'ree's last appearance on the chart. Eventually, Mind Adventures was released in the US in 1995, but it excluded "Feel So High" from its track list as it had been included on her second album.

Critical reception
The song received good reviews from music critcs, and Des'ree drew comparisons with American singer Anita Baker for her deep voice and her music style. AllMusic editor Tom Demalon described it as a "slinky, mid-tempo" song and noted further that Des'ree "possesses a pleasing vocal delivery". Larry Flick from Billboard said the newcomer "exudes a unique and refreshing style that is at first introspective and folkish, and then sophisticated and jazzy." Dave Sholin from the Gavin Report wrote, "Once again, Des'ree's soothing style compliments the music, giving the listener reason to feel good." Jim Arundel from Melody Maker remarked that her voice "has grace to spare, and a languidly divine tone." He concluded, "Seriously, this is a song so apart from mundanity, it qualifies as Fine Art." 

A reviewer from Music & Media felt that the singer-songwriter is a "real asset to the genre. Her soulful debut single could give her the same quick start as Tracy Chapman." Head of programmes Keith Pringle on Piccadilly Radio/Manchester said, "It's a classy record with a great hook. The sound fits the station, as we found out by testing the record with a phone panel. Just like Beverley Craven, it will take some re-releases before it will be a hit, but we're giving this single the lifetime of a hit." John Kilgo from The Network Forty remarked the "smooth polished vocals and a subtle hook that entices you to sing along after just one listen." Mark Frith from Select viewed it as a "beautifully haunting gospel-like track".

Music video
Three music videos were shot, the first two for the original release and the 1992 re-release, and a new one was filmed for the US release in 1995. The original video features Des'ree walking around a botanical garden with female friends with dancers on the background. There's also shot of Des'ree singing surrounded by candles and shots of Des'ree with a man in a bed and then singing with him embracing her. The video for the 1992 re-release shows Des'ree painting a portrait of a man. Eventually, she enters the portrait to meet the man. The video for the 1995 US release shows Des'ree singing in a desert.

Track listings

1991 release
 7-inch single – UK
 "Feel So High" – 3:52
 "Got To Be Strong" – 2:07

 CD maxi, 12-inch single (UK)
 "Feel So High" – 3:52
 "Got To Be Strong" – 2:07
 "Stand On My Own Ground" (1st draft) – 4:43

1992 release
 7-inch single, cassette Single (UK)
 "Feel So High" (New Born Again mix) – 3:52
 "Save This Promised Land" (a capella) – 3:21

 CD single Europe
 "Feel So High" (New Born Again mix) – 3:52
 "Feel So High" (The Elevation mix) – 5:25
 "Save This Promised Land" (a capella) – 3:21
 "Got To Be Strong" – 2:07

 12-inch maxi – UK
 "Feel So High" (The Elevation mix) – 5:25
 "Feel So High" (New Born Again mix) – 3:52
 "Save This Promised Land" (a capella) – 3:21
 "Got To Be Strong" – 2:07

1995 release
 CD single – US
 "Feel So High" – 3:53
 "Mind Adventures" – 4:45
 "Innocent & Naive" – 3:40
 "You Gotta Be" (Love Will Save The Day mix) – 4:04

 CD single – Japan
 "Feel So High" (The Family Stand remix) – 3:53
 "You Gotta Be" (Hourglass mix) – 3:51
 "Little Child" – 3:53
 "I Ain't Movin'" – 3:33
 "You Gotta Be" (Love Will Save The Day mix) – 4:04
 "Take A Chance" – 5:13

Charts

Weekly charts

Year-end charts

Samples
In 1997, "Feel So High" was interpolated into the Janet Jackson song "Got 'til It's Gone" from Jackson's CD The Velvet Rope without due credit to Des'ree as a contributor. The maxi single, released in 2000, lists Des'ree and Michael Graves as two of the song's writers.

References

1991 debut singles
1992 singles
1995 singles
Des'ree songs
1991 songs
S2 Records singles
Epic Records singles